Tommy Lloyd (born December 21, 1974) is an American college basketball coach, and the current head coach at the University of Arizona of the Pac-12 Conference.  His 61 wins in the first two seasons are the most for any head coach in NCAA Division I history.

Playing career
Born and raised in Kelso, Washington, Lloyd graduated from Kelso High School in 1993. During his senior year, he led the Hilanders to a 21–4 record and to the WIAA state 4A tournament, their first appearance in fifteen years.

Lloyd began his collegiate career at Walla Walla Community College in Walla Walla; his 52 points against Treasure Valley Community College still stands as the school's single-game record. In his sophomore season, he averaged over twenty points per game and was selected to the Northwest Athletic Association of Community Colleges (now Northwest Athletic Conference) Eastern All-Star team. After graduating from WWCC, Lloyd transferred to Colorado State University–Pueblo. After one year with the ThunderWolves, he returned to Walla Walla to play his senior season at Whitman College, and graduated in 1998.

Lloyd played professionally in Australia and Germany.

Coaching career

Gonzaga
According to a 2020 story by ESPN journalist Jeff Borzello, Lloyd's journey to his assistant coach position at Gonzaga actually began while he was playing in junior college. At the time, Gonzaga was still recruiting in Walla Walla's conference. After watching Lloyd, Gonzaga coach Dan Monson told him that he would not be offered a scholarship, but that if he ever wanted to go into coaching, he should give Monson a call. He made the call to Monson after his Whitman career, but had to back out once receiving an opportunity to play overseas. After his playing career, he and his wife Chanelle spent several months backpacking on several continents before he decided to begin a coaching career. By that time, Monson had left for Minnesota immediately after Gonzaga's 1999 Elite Eight run, and his top assistant Mark Few had replaced him as the Zags' head coach. Few honored the tacit agreement Monson had made with Lloyd, and Lloyd joined the men's basketball staff as a volunteer administrative assistant in 2000, becoming a full-time assistant the next year.

Lloyd soon became Gonzaga's key international recruiter. He began to develop a niche as an international recruiter early in his tenure on Few's staff. In Borzello's story, Few recalled that one area where he wanted Lloyd to develop was recruiting, telling him that in order to become an assistant at a top program, he needed a niche. Few told Borzello,

Among the international players that Lloyd has played a role in recruiting are former Bulldogs Mario Kasun (Croatia), Ronny Turiaf (France), J.P. Batista (Brazil), Abdullahi Kuso (Nigeria), Robert Sacre (Canada), Kelly Olynyk (Canada), Elias Harris (Germany), Kevin Pangos (Canada), Przemek Karnowski (Poland), Domantas Sabonis (Lithuania), Rui Hachimura (Japan), Killian Tillie (France), and Filip Petrušev (Serbia), as well as current Gonzaga players Joël Ayayi (France), Martynas Arlauskas (Lithuania), Pavel Zakharov (Russia), and Oumar Ballo (Mali). Lloyd has also been integral in developing NBA players for Gonzaga like Turiaf, Adam Morrison, Jeremy Pargo, Austin Daye, Sacre, Olynyk, Kyle Wiltjer, Sabonis, Zach Collins, Hachimura, and Brandon Clarke.

Lloyd had previously turned down numerous interview requests for head-coaching positions during his Gonzaga tenure. He was contractually guaranteed of becoming the Bulldogs' next head coach upon Few's departure. Gonzaga athletic director Mike Roth said, "Tommy has it in writing from me and the [university] president that says, as long as he's here, when Mark retires, it's your job. He's got a document. I've got a document. The president's got a document. Our general counsel has a document. It's his job." However, in 2021, Lloyd left Gonzaga for the head-coaching position at the University of Arizona.

Arizona
Two weeks after the 2021 NCAA tournament ended, Lloyd was announced as a candidate for the vacant head-coaching position at Arizona, which had been led the previous 12 seasons by Sean Miller. On April 15, 2021, Lloyd was introduced as Arizona's 18th head basketball coach.  Coach Lloyd earned his first win in his first collegiate game as a head coach on November 9, 2021, beating Northern Arizona 81–52. Two weeks after his first career coaching victory, he earned his first victory over a ranked opponent, No. 4 Michigan, 80–62 to win the Roman Main Event and start the season 5–0.  Also with his 5–0 start, Coach Lloyd became the first in division I history to win his first five games, win by an average of 30 points per game & beat an AP top-5 team.  Arizona entered the top 25 AP Poll for the first time under Coach Lloyd at Number 17, on November 22, 2021.  On December 5, Coach Lloyd defeated his first Pac-12 opponent in his first Pac-12 game, the Oregon State Beavers, 90–65.  In the December 13, 2021 AP poll, Arizona reached the top 10 for the first time under coach Lloyd, coming in at number 8.  Coach Lloyd lost the first game of his career & season in Knoxville on December 22, 2021, 73–77 against no. 19 Tennessee.  On  January 17, 2022, Arizona made it into the top 5 for the first time under Coach Lloyd, coming in at no. 3 in  the AP poll.  It was the program's first time in the top 5 since the 2017―18 season. The AP poll's update on February 21, 2022, placed Arizona no. 2 in the nation, following only Lloyd's former team, Gonzaga.  Coach Lloyd & the Arizona Wildcats would win their 1st regular season conference title under Lloyd & 17th overall as a program with a 91–71 win over USC.  After defeating Cal in the final regular season game, 89–61, Arizona  & Coach Lloyd became the first program & coach to win 18 conference games in one season.  They earned the Number 1 seed in the 2022 Pac-12 tournament.  Coach Lloyd & Arizona would go on to defeat Stanford 84–80 in the Quarterfinals, Colorado 82–72 in the Semifinals & UCLA 84–76 in the finals to win Arizona’s eighth conference tournament title overall & Coach Lloyd’s first.  Following the end of the season Coach Lloyd won the  AP Coach of the Year, NABC Coach of the Year & USBWA Coach of the Year.

Before the 2022–23 season, Arizona had three players, Bennedict Mathruin (Pacers), Dalen Terry(Bulls) & Christian Koloko (Raptors) taken in the 2022 NBA Draft.  Arizona would begin the season 6–0, which included winning the 2023 Maui Invitational with wins over No.17 San Diego State & No. 10 Creighton.  The team also played in the Las Vegas Clash, a neutral site game against No. 14 Indiana, which Arizona won 89–75.  Arizona's last big non-conference matchup would feature a home game against No. 6 Tennessee, with Arizona winning 75–70.  Arizona & Coach Lloyd would end the non-conference part of the schedule with a record of 12–0.  Lloyd would become the fastest coach to 50 wins, doing so in 57 games, with a 58–52 win over their rival No. 5 UCLA, it was Arizona's 5th win over a ranked team during the season.  Arizona would end the season losing to their rival in Los Angeles, 73–82, giving them an overall record of 25–6 & 14–6 in conference play.  They would enter postseason play ranked No. 8 overall & the No. 2 in the 2023 Pac-12 Tournament in Las Vegas.  Arizona defeated No. 10 seed Stanford Cardinal 95–84, which was his 59th career win, the most of any head coach to start their coaching career.  Arizona defeated Arizona State in the Semifinals, 78-59. Arizona then defeated rivals UCLA 61-59 to win Arizona’s ninth conference tournament title overall, and the second title in a row.  Arizona earn a No. 2 seed in the South Region of the 2023 NCAA Tournament, with a first round match up against Ivy League Champion and No. 15 seed Princeton.  Arizona was upset 55–59, ending their season with an overall record of 28–7.

Head coaching record

Personal life
According to Borzello, Lloyd "loves Gonzaga and he loves Spokane." He and his wife Chanelle built a new house in Spokane in 2018, with a "video game system covered in Gonzaga paraphernalia in the basement." They have two daughters and a son; son Liam plays basketball at Northern Arizona University. During the construction of their current home, the family lived in the childhood home of Bulldogs legend and Hall of Famer John Stockton.

References

External links
Gonzaga Bulldogs bio

1974 births
Living people
American men's basketball coaches
American men's basketball players
Arizona Wildcats men's basketball coaches
Basketball coaches from Washington (state)
Basketball players from Washington (state)
College men's basketball head coaches in the United States
CSU Pueblo ThunderWolves men's basketball players
Gonzaga Bulldogs men's basketball coaches
Junior college men's basketball players in the United States
People from Kelso, Washington
Whitman Blues men's basketball players